The Oregon Ducks football statistical leaders are individual statistical leaders of the Oregon Ducks football program in various categories, including passing rushing receiving total offense, defensive stats, and kicking. Within those areas, the lists identify single-game, single-season, and career leaders. The Ducks represent the University of Oregon in the NCAA's Pac-12 Conference.

Although Oregon began competing in intercollegiate football in 1894, the school's official record book considers the "modern era" to have begun around 1940. Records from before this year are often incomplete and inconsistent, and they are generally not included in these lists.

These lists are dominated by more recent players for several reasons:
 Since 1940, seasons have increased from 10 games to 11 and then 12 games in length.
 The NCAA didn't allow freshmen to play varsity football until 1972 (with the exception of the World War II years), allowing players to have four-year careers.
 Bowl games only began counting toward single-season and career statistics in 2002. The Ducks have played in a bowl game in 14 of the seasons since this decision, allowing players on recent teams an extra game to accumulate statistics. In fact, the Ducks played in 2 bowl games as part of the inaugural College Football Playoff after the 2014 season. Similarly, the Ducks have played in the Pac-12 Championship Game twice in the four years it has existed, giving players in 2011 and 2014 yet another chance to increase their stat totals.
 Oregon has had over 5,000 yards of total offense 17 times, all since 1997. The Ducks have broken the 6000-yard barrier eight times as a team, all since 2007. The Ducks eclipsed 7,000 yards in 2011 and 2013, and topped 8,000 yards in 2014.
 Due to COVID-19 issues, the NCAA ruled that the 2020 season would not count against the athletic eligibility of any football player, giving everyone who played in that season the opportunity for five years of eligibility instead of the normal four.

Career and single-season lists are updated through the end of the 2017 season.

Passing

Passing yards

Passing touchdowns

Rushing

Rushing yards

Rushing touchdowns

Receiving

Receptions

Receiving yards

Receiving touchdowns

Total offense
Total offense is the sum of passing and rushing statistics. It does not include receiving or returns.

Total offense yards

Touchdowns responsible for
"Touchdowns responsible for" is the NCAA's official term for combined passing and rushing touchdowns.

Defense

Interceptions

Tackles

Sacks

Kicking

Field goals made

Field goal percentage

References

Oregon

Oregon sports-related lists